A Deleted Symphony for the Beaten Down is the third full-length album by the New Orleans-based sludgecore band Soilent Green, released on September 14, 2001 through Relapse Records. The original title of this album was The Devil Wears a Lamb's Skin.

Track listing

Personnel
Soilent Green
Louis Benjamin Falgoust II – vocals
Brian Patton - lead guitar
Ben Stout – rhythm guitar
Scott Williams – bass
Tommy Buckley – drums

Production
Dave Shirk - mastering
Dave Fortman - producer, recording, mixing
Paul Romano - design
Bill Sienkiewicz - cover art
Brian Patton - design elements
Matthew Jacobson - executive producer

References

2001 albums
Soilent Green albums
Relapse Records albums